Ruslan Glebov , also known as Ruslan Glibov (born 1987), is a Ukrainian orienteering competitor. He was born in Dnipro, Ukraine.

He has competed at the 2008, 2009, 2012, 2014, 2015, 2016, 2017, and 2018 World Orienteering Championships, and his best result until 2018 was a fifth place in the mixed relay in 2014.

He won a silver medal in the long distance at the 2018 World Orienteering Championships in Latvia, behind Olav Lundanes. In 2021, he won a bronze medal in the Middle Distance discipline, held in the Czech Republic.

Ruslan also holds an overall title in the 5-days tour O-ringen after winning the 2019 edition. O-ringen is widely considered the most prestigious event outside of championship level.

His achievements as junior include a bronze medal in the sprint at the 2006 Junior World Orienteering Championships in Lithuania.

References

External links

Ukrainian orienteers
Male orienteers
Foot orienteers
1987 births
Living people
Sportspeople from Dnipro
Competitors at the 2017 World Games
21st-century Ukrainian people
Junior World Orienteering Championships medalists
Competitors at the 2022 World Games